Ronald Burns Wylde (7 January 1913 – 8 July 2000) was a South African born Scottish athlete who competed in the 1934 British Empire Games.  He was also a medical doctor who practised in Grahamstown. South Africa.  He attended St. Andrew's College, Grahamstown, and studied medicine at the University of Edinburgh.

At the 1934 Empire Games he was a member of the Scottish relay team which won the bronze medal in the 4×440 yards event. In the 440 yards competition he was eliminated in the heats.

References

External links 

 commonwealthgames.com results

1913 births
2000 deaths
South African people of Scottish descent
Scottish male sprinters
Athletes (track and field) at the 1934 British Empire Games
Commonwealth Games bronze medallists for Scotland
Commonwealth Games medallists in athletics
Alumni of St. Andrew's College, Grahamstown
Medallists at the 1934 British Empire Games